Stadionul Municipal Hîncești (formerly named Stadionul Orășenesc Hîncești) is a football stadium in city of Hîncești, Moldova built in 1975.

References

External links
soccerway

Football venues in Moldova
Hîncești District
Multi-purpose stadiums
CS Petrocub Hîncești